Smiley Creswell (born December 11, 1959) is a former American football defensive end. He played for the Philadelphia Eagles and New England Patriots in 1985 and also appeared in Super Bowl XX.

References

1959 births
Living people
American football defensive ends
Michigan State Spartans football players
Philadelphia Eagles players
New England Patriots players